Nakhangal is a 1973 Indian Malayalam-language film, directed by A. Vincent and produced by Hari Pothan. It is based on the novel of the same name by Vaikom Chandrasekharan Nair. The film stars Madhu, Jayabharathi, K. R. Vijaya and Kaviyoor Ponnamma. It was released on 8 September 1973.

Plot

Cast 

Madhu as Sankarankutty
Jayabharathi as Gomu
K. R. Vijaya as Saraswathy Mathew
Kaviyoor Ponnamma as Kaakkachi
KPAC Lalitha as Maya
Adoor Bhasi as Jose
Thikkurissy Sukumaran Nair as Judge
Muthukulam Raghavan Pillai as Paili
Sankaradi
T. R. Omana as Pankiyamma
Raghavan as Yesudas
T. S. Muthaiah as Muthappan
Bahadoor as Pappukkutty
K. P. Ummer
Meena as Annamma
Paravoor Bharathan as John Sebastian
Radhamani
S. P. Pillai as Pappunni
Veeran

Soundtrack 
The music was composed by G. Devarajan and the lyrics were written by Vayalar Ramavarma.

References

External links 
 

1970s Malayalam-language films
1973 films
Films based on Indian novels
Films directed by A. Vincent